Marinococcus halophilus is a Gram-positive and halophilic bacterium from the genus of Marinococcus which has been isolated from a salted mackerel. Marinococcus halophilus produces ectoine.

References

Further reading 
 
 
 

 

Bacillaceae
Bacteria described in 1976